Contig is a command line defragmentation utility for Windows developed by Microsoft as part of the Sysinternals Suite.

Operation 
Contig is designed to defragment individual files, or specified groups of files, and does not attempt to move files to the beginning of the partition. Unlike the Windows built-in defragmenter tool, Contig can defragment individual files, individual directories, and subsets of the file system using wildcards.

Contig does not move any data except that belonging to the file in the question, so the amount it can defragment a file is limited to the largest contiguous block of free space on a system. Use of contig exchanges decreased file fragmentation for increased free space fragmentation.

Combined usage of the -s parameter and the wildcard symbol * allows whole directories and drives to be defragmented: for example,
contig -s C:\*
will defrag all the files on hard drive C. The -s parameters means to browse directories recursively.

Directories, for example, can be defragmented with the following command. This will help speed up accessing files in a directory with many hundreds or thousands of files.
for /R /D %a in (*.*) do start /b contig -q "%a" > nul

Adding the -v parameter to the command runs contig in verbose mode.
For instance:
contig -v -s C:\*

When the filesystem is NTFS, contig can also analyse and defragment the following files:

For instance:
contig -v -s $mft

A small change to the Windows registry allows entire folders to be defragmented from Windows Explorer. New unfragmented files with specified name and length can be created.

Derivative programs that use Contig include Power Defragmenter GUI and Multiple Applicator 6.8. A related freeware product by the same author is PageDefrag.

Limitations
 Contig can't defragment files accessed through directory mount points (as opposed to drive letter mounts). Using an additional (temporary) drive letter will circumvent this problem. See subst command.
 Contig doesn't work in Telnet sessions, but it is possible to execute it on remote machines using Sysinternals PsExec.

See also
 Comparison of defragmentation software
 Defragmentation
 File system fragmentation
 List of defragmentation software

Notes and references 

Winternals: Defragmentation, Recovery, and Administration Field Guide by Dave Kleiman, Laura Hunter, Mahesh Satyanarayana, Kimon Andreou, Nancy G Altholz, Lawrence Abrams, Darren Windham, Tony Bradley and Brian Barber (2006) - Syngress

External links
Microsoft Technet site Contig page
Power Defragmenter GUI, mentioned above in the article, is a graphical interface for Contig

Windows-only freeware
Defragmentation software